Kusin Ch'utu (Aymara kusi happiness, fortune, good luck, -n(i) a suffix to indicate ownership, ch'utu peak of a mountain, top of the head, Hispanicized spelling Cusin Chuto) is a  mountain in the Andes of Bolivia. It is located in the Oruro Department, Sajama Province, in the north of the Turco Municipality. Kusin Ch'utu is situated north-east of the mountains Qhapaqa, Yaritani and Kimsa Chata. The river Q'ulini ("the one with stripes", Culini) originates at the mountain. It flows to the south-east.

References 

Mountains of Oruro Department